is a retired male long-distance runner from Japan, who won the 1995 edition of Amsterdam Marathon, clocking 2:14:00 on September 24, 1995.

Achievements

References

1971 births
Living people
Place of birth missing (living people)
Japanese male long-distance runners
Japanese male marathon runners
Japanese male cross country runners
Japan Championships in Athletics winners
21st-century Japanese people
20th-century Japanese people